An Action Hero is a 2022 Indian Hindi-language action film directed by debutant Anirudh Iyer and written by Neeraj Yadav, based on an original story by Iyer. It was produced by Bhushan Kumar and Krishan Kumar, under T-Series Films, and Aanand L. Rai, under Colour Yellow Productions. The film stars Ayushmann Khurrana and Jaideep Ahlawat in lead roles.

Plot 
Maanav is a popular actor, known as a leading man in action films. For his upcoming film shoot, he heads to Mandothi in Haryana. Vicky Solanki, an aspiring strongman politician currently contesting the local elections, wants to meet Maanav gain publicity. Due to busy shooting schedule Maanav does not pay heed. Just when he is about to meet Vicky, he is distracted by the delivery of his new Ford Mustang and goes for a long drive. However, an enraged Vicky follows and manhandles him. Maanav enraged by Vicky's actions pushes him away. Vicky dies from blunt force trauma, on the spot after landing head first on a rock.

Frightened, Maanav flees to his house in Portsmouth, UK. Unbeknownst to him Vicky's brother, Bhoora Singh Solanki, a municipal councilor of Mandothi, is on his tail to hunt him down. The Haryana police conclude role of Maanav in Vicky's murder citing the side mirror of Maanav's new Mustang. Maanav's reputation is degraded and his films are boycotted. The news reaches UK, as well, and Maanav is forced to hide himself from the UK police, and later witnesses Bhoora killing two British officers at his home.

Maanav manages to escape the scene and tries to seek help from his UK lawyer, who does not respond. During his attempt to escape Maanav's car runs out of gas and Bhoora confronts him. He tries to prove his innocence, but Bhoora does not listen and tries to kill him. Maanav manages overpower and lock Bhoora in the car's trunk. Upon pressuring his manager, Roshan, for help, Maanav finally gets to meet another lawyer and fixer, Sai, for capturing potential footage of Bhoora killing the two cops. Sai tells Maanav to meet his contact in London, for collecting the footage.

Meanwhile, Bhoora escapes by calling a towing company and follows and kills Sai. When Bhoora was about to kill Maanav, he is intercepted by Kaadir, Sai's friend. Maanav and Bhoora together overpower Kaadir, but Maanav gets in the car and flees again leaving Bhoora behind. Bhoora manages to learn of Maanav's whereabouts from Kaadir as a hostage. Meanwhile, Maanav gets fed up of hiding, and surrenders himself to the police with the footage that Sai's contact procured from the dashcams of the cars nearby Maanav's house in Portsmouth. Masood Abraham Katkar, a feared terrorist from the D-Company, who was taunted by Maanav as irrelevant, abducts him through his men. He is taken to a rooftop, where Katkar is awaiting him.

Katkar takes a photograph with Maanav, seemingly planning on sending it to the media, to paint a picture that Maanav has contacts in the underworld. Katkar tells Maanav to perform at his granddaughter's wedding, in exchange for his freedom. Bhoora arrives and disrupts Maanav's dance number, only to be held at gunpoint, by Katkar's men. After an interrogation, Katkar advises Bhoora to kill Maanav. His image with Katkar becomes viral on social media and the news, just as Bhoora is about to shoot, Maanav deflects him and Katkar was shot dead in the skirmish.

Katkar's men are alerted and arrive to kill them both. Maanav and Bhoora manage to defeat Katkar's men, before turning on each other. With his newfound inner strength, Maanav defeats and wounds Bhoora. Later, Maanav formulates a plan to make a deal with the Indian Embassy to project a story that the government used Maanav's situation and assigned him for the mission to track and kill Katkar, thus saving him from imprisonment. Bhoora refuses to spare him, out of ego, despite fully being aware of his innocence from the beginning. With no choice left, Maanav kills Bhoora and his plan succeeds and returns to India to find himself surrounded by greetings from his fans and the public outside the Mumbai airport.

Cast
 Ayushmann Khurrana as Maanav Khuranna
 Jaideep Ahlawat as Bhoora Singh Solanki
 Jitender Hooda as Roop Kumar, Police Inspector 
 Neeraj Madhav as Sai 
 Harsh Chhaya as Roshan, Manav's assistant 
 Gautam Joglekar as Masood Abraham Katkar
 Malaika Arora as Maanav's dance partner in the song "Aap Jaisa Koi"
 Nora Fatehi as Maanav's heroine in the song "Jehda Nasha"
 Akanksha Vishwakarma as Sheetal, the Assistant director
 Akshay Kumar (cameo appearance)
 Ajay Raju as Spot Boy

Production

Development
The film was announced in October 2021.

Filming
Filming began in January 2022 in London and concluded in March 2022.

Music

The music of the film is composed by Tanishk Bagchi, Biddu, Parag Chhabra and Amar Jalal. The background score is composed by Sunny M.R. and the Action Hero Theme is composed by Parag Chhabra.

The song "Jehda Nasha" was recreated from the 2019 track Nasha which was sung by IP Singh, Amar Jalal, written by Amar Jalal Group and composed by Faridkot, Amar Jalal. The song "Aap Jaisa Koi" was recreated from the 1980 film Qurbani sung by Pakistani singer Nazia Hassan, and was composed by British Indian producer Biddu. The song was featured in the film as an item number, picturised on Zeenat Aman.

The film version of "Aap Jaisa Koi" replaces original male vocalist Altamash Faridi with Yash Narvekar.

Release
An Action Hero had its trailer released on T-Series' YouTube Channel. The film was theatrically released on 2 December 2022. Digital rights were acquired by Netflix and was released on 27 January 2023.

Reception 
An Action Hero received positive reviews from critics

Bollywood Hungama rated the film 4 out of 5 stars and wrote "An Action Hero works due to Ayushmann's action-oriented role and Jaideep's screen presence. The twist in the last 30 minutes adds to the fun". Saibal Chatterjee of NDTV rated the film 3.5 out of 5 stars and wrote "The film bustles with coiled energy every time Jaideep Ahlawat is on the screen as a toughie responding to a rough, ready and rustic notion of justice and self-worth". Sonil Dedhia of News 18 rated  the film 3.5 out of 5 stars and said that the film is "wacky, breezy, bizzare and outlandish". Pratikshya Mishra of The Quint rated the film 3.5 out of 5 stars and wrote "The film makes fun of everything it can get its hands on while weaving a story worthy of its strong cast". Devesh Sharma of Filmfare rated the film 3.5 out of 5 stars and wrote "The film is cleverly written. It serves us twists and turns admiringly well. The insider jokes are a hoot. The arrogance of a superstar is on point". Kartik Bhardwaj of Cinema Express rated the film 3.5 out of 5 stars and wrote "Ayushmann Khurrana and Jaideep Ahlawat lock horns in this cheeky take on stars, fans, and media culture". Himesh Mankad of Pinkvilla rated the film 3.5 out of 5 stars and wrote "An Action Hero is an intelligently written action thriller, wherein the director follows his conviction to strike the right balance in the genre with some humor and whacky scenarios".

Rohit Bhatnagar of The Free Press Journal rated the film 3.5 out of 5 stars and said that the film might derail from the set formula concept, but it might entertain and delve deeper into world affairs. Fengyn Chiu of Mashable rated the film 3.5 out of 5 stars and wrote "Ayushmann Khurrana and Jaideep Ahlawat will take you a wild ride filled with black comedy, suspense, satire". Sukanya Verma of Rediff rated the film 3 out of 5 stars and wrote "An Action Hero oil and water combination of genres doesn't always gel, gets overly far-fetched in places but still holds up on the strength of whimsy and surprise". Archika Khurana of The Times of India rated the film 3 out of 5 stars and wrote "The interesting thing about the film is not so much the story itself, but seeing Ayushmann Khurrana get into the skin of an action hero and flex his muscles (literally) on screen". Bharathi Pradhan of Lehren rated the film 3 out of 5 stars and summarized "Bollywood Plays Hero & Victim". Anna M. M. Vetticad of Firstpost rated the film 2.75 out of 5 stars and described it as "a fun package.” Vetticad praised the chemistry between the two leads but commented on the lack of female characters: “It’s a good thing that the narrative’s drooping minutes don’t last long, because it is in those minutes that the glaring absence of women from the scene becomes impossible to ignore. Rahul Desai from Film Companion wrote "This is perhaps his timeliest and most pressing deed yet. After all, is there a bigger underdog than mainstream Hindi cinema today?"

References

External links 
 
 An Action Hero on Box Office India
 An Action Hero on Bollywood Hungama

2022 films
Indian action films
2022 action films
Films about actors
Films set in England
Indian chase films
Hindi-language action films